Gonyostomus insularis is a species of air-breathing land snails, terrestrial pulmonate gastropod mollusks in the family Strophocheilidae.

This species is endemic to Brazil.

References

Strophocheilidae
Endemic fauna of Brazil
Gastropods described in 1974
Taxonomy articles created by Polbot